Senakhtenre Ahmose, was a king of the Seventeenth Dynasty of Egypt during the Second Intermediate Period. Senakhtenre reigned for a short period over the Theban region in Upper Egypt at a time where the Hyksos 15th Dynasty ruled Lower Egypt. Senakhtenre died c.1560 or 1558 BC at the latest.

Family

He may or may not have been the son of Nubkheperre Intef, the most prominent of the Intef kings. The Danish Egyptologist Kim Ryholt observes that "since Senaktenre was remembered as one of the Lords of the West alongside Seqenenre and Kamose, he is generally believed to have been a member of the family of Ahmose and as such identified with the otherwise unidentified spouse" of Queen Tetisheri, Ahmose's grandmother. He was succeeded by his son, Seqenenre Tao. King Senakhtenre would also be the husband of Tetisheri who is called the "great king's wife" and "the mother of my mother" in a stela at Abydos by pharaoh Ahmose I. Senakhtenre was, therefore, the grandfather of Ahmose I.

Attestations
Unlike his two successors, Tao and Kamose, Senakhtenre is a relatively obscure king and, until 2012, was not attested "by [any] contemporary sources (by his prenomen) but exclusively by sources dating from the New Kingdom: the Karnak king list [of Tuthmose III] and [in] two Theban tombs." Donald Redford's book mentions these 2 Theban tombs. The archaeological evidence prior to 2012 suggests that his reign was brief and lasted several months or 1 year at the most. However, in 2012, two important contemporary monuments of this king were uncovered at Karnak: a doorway found carved with his royal name as well as a fragmentary limestone lintel. The doorway or gate is carved with other hieroglyphic inscriptions which state that Senaktenre had this monument, which is carved from limestone blocks, transported from Tura (modern Helwan, south of Cairo), which was under Hyksos rule during his reign.

Senakhtenre's nomen

Pre-2012 hypotheses
From a reference in the Abbott Papyrus (Column III, 1.10) it was for a long time believed that Senakhtenre's nomen was Tao ("The Elder"). Indeed, the papyrus mentions two kings with the name Tao. The second king Tao was identified with Senakhtenre because the first mention of a Tao refers to Seqenenre Tao for which the complete name is written. Consequently, the hypothesis that Senakhtenre's nomen was Tao was dominant in egyptology until 2012 and was shared for example by Darrell Baker, although it also remained controversial. For example, the Egyptologist Claude Vandersleyen rejected this view as early as 1983. Furthermore, in his 1997 study of the second intermediate period, the egyptologist Kim Ryholt proposed that Senakhtenre's nomen may have been Siamun rather than Tao:

Senakhtenre's nomen discovered
The situation completely changed in March 2012 when French egyptologist Sébastien Biston-Moulin of the CFEETK (Centre Franco-Égyptien d'Étude des Temples de Karnak) published hieroglyphic inscriptions discovered on a large 17th dynasty limestone doorjamb built for a granary of a temple of Amun at Karnak. The doorjamb bears Senakhtenre's full royal name and reveals his nomen to have been Ahmose. This is the same name as that of his grandson, Nebpehtyre Ahmose I, who founded the 18th Dynasty by defeating the Hyksos and ousting them from Egypt. Inscriptions on the door indicate that it was built following the orders of Senakhtenre himself. The door was subsequently re-used and discovered in the foundations of a later building adjoining the temple of Ptah at Karnak. Senakhtenre's royal titulary as revealed by the door is "Hr mry-mAa.t nswt bjty snxt-n-ra sA ra jaH-ms", which translates as "The Horus Merymaat, the king of Upper and Lower Egypt Senakhtenre, the Son of Re Ahmes." The inscription on the reused door proceeds to state that Senakhtenre "made a monument for his father Amun-Re (i.e., the door itself)...from the beautiful white stone of Anu." Anu is the modern Tura, located near Cairo, which could mean that Senakhtenre imported the limestone from the then Hyksos controlled area of Tura in Lower Egypt.  However, Biston-Moulin cautions that "beautiful white stone of Anu" was sometimes used as a generic term for stones which were actually taken from local quarries.  Meanwhile, a fragmentary lintel uncovered by the same team of French scholars bore this inscription which mentioned Senakhtenre's nomen:

These two separate inscriptions on the granary door and fragmentary lintel found in January–February 2012 at Karnak demonstrate that king Senakhtenre's nomen or birth name was 'Ahmose' ('Ahmes' in Ancient Egyptian) and not 'Tao' as previously thought. Biston-Moulin writes in the summary of his article:

References

Bibliography

 
 
 

16th-century BC Pharaohs
Pharaohs of the Seventeenth Dynasty of Egypt
16th-century BC deaths
Year of birth unknown